Makenke is a neighborhood within Mbarara City, in the Western Region of Uganda.

Location
Makenke is located in Kakiika Parish, in Kakiika sub-county, 

It borders with Kakyenkye to the north, Koranorya to the east, Kakoba to the south west and Nyamityobora to the west. The geographical coordinates of Makenke are 0°34'42.0"S, 30°41'08.0"E (Latitude:-0.578333; Longitude:30.685556).

Overview
Makenke is a low income settlement in the city of Mbarara. The settlement is found in the Kakiika Division of Mbarara City Council. Prior to that, Makenke was part of Kashari County until July 2014 when it was incorporated into Mbarara Municipality.

The 2nd Division of the Uganda People's Defense Force (UPDF) maintains its headquarters at Makenke. In the Makenke barracks, Wazalendo Savings and Credit Cooperative Society maintains a branch. It is also the location of Mbarara Army boarding secondary School and Mbarara Army primary school, that cater to the children of the soldiers and other neighbouring civilian settlers.

Makenke is the location of Mbarara Industrial Park, administered by the Uganda Investment Authority. Mbarara Coca Cola Bottling Plant, owned by Century Bottling Company Limited, a subsidiary of Coca Cola International, is located in Makenke. 

See also
 Ankole Sub-Region

References

External links
 Uganda: 'Makenke Barracks Too Full' As at 19 October 2001.

Neighborhoods in Mbarara